Lawrence Neil Bonnett (July 30, 1946 – February 11, 1994) was an American NASCAR driver who compiled 18 victories and 20 poles over his 18-year career. Bonnett was a member of the Alabama Gang, and started his career with the help of Bobby and Donnie Allison. He rose to prominence in the late 1970s with his performances in cars owned by Jim Stacy and Wood Brothers Racing, becoming one of the top competitors in the 1980s. The Alabama native currently ranks 47th in all-time NASCAR Cup victories. He appeared in the 1983 film Stroker Ace and the 1990 film Days of Thunder. Bonnett hosted the TV show Winners for TNN from 1991 to 1994. He was a color commentator for CBS, TBS, and TNN in the years until his death. Bonnett's driving career was interrupted by a severe brain injury from a crash in 1990. He was killed while practicing for the 1994 Daytona 500 for a much-anticipated comeback.

NASCAR career
Bonnett was born in the Birmingham suburb of Hueytown, Alabama on July 30, 1946. Bonnett began his NASCAR career as a protégé of 1983 Winston Cup champion Bobby Allison, working on the team's cars. He later became part of the famous "Alabama Gang" that included himself, Red Farmer and the Allison family: father Bobby, brother Donnie and, later, son Davey. He began driving in NASCAR in 1974 and earned his first victory in 1977 at the Capital City 400 in Richmond, Virginia driving for Harry Hyde-Jim Stacy Racing, which had bought out the K&K Insurance team that he had previously driven for. He had another victory in 1977 at the Los Angeles Times 500, which would be the last Dodge win in NASCAR until 2001. Many in racing circles thought 1978 would be his year to dominate, but troubles with his cars (the new for '78 Dodge Magnum) and financial problems between Hyde and Stacy caused his cars to fail and to drop out of many races. In addition, Bonnett had grown tired of Stacy's dictatorial management style and tendency to miss payments, which led to Hyde suing Stacy for unpaid bills.  In 1979 he signed with Wood Brothers Racing to replaced David Pearson and revived his career with three victories.  He later won back-to-back World 600s (NASCAR's longest race, now the Coca-Cola 600) in 1982 and 1983 and back-to-back Busch Clash victories in 1983 and '84, including his first in which he did not win a single pole from the previous season, but was selected as a wild card entry.

In 1984, Bonnett joined Junior Johnson's team, becoming a teammate to Darrell Waltrip. In 1985, he had one of his best seasons, finishing fourth in the points standings while Waltrip went on to win his third championship.

Bonnett participated in International Race of Champions (IROC) during three seasons (1979, 1980, and 1984), and finished second twice.

Bonnett holds the distinction of being the winner of the first ever NASCAR race held outside of North America when he won the 1988 Goodyear NASCAR 500 at the Calder Park Thunderdome in Melbourne, Australia (at the time the newly opened Thunderdome was also the first NASCAR style speedway to be built outside of North America). The race, run two weeks after the Daytona 500, was not a Winston Cup race but featured some drivers from the series including fellow Alabama Gang member Bobby Allison, Michael Waltrip, Dave Marcis and Kyle Petty who were up against Australian drivers somewhat new to NASCAR racing. Bonnett, who had won the Pontiac Excitement 400 at Richmond International Raceway the previous weekend, started from the pole driving his Valvoline sponsored Pontiac Grand Prix. He and Allison (who had won the Daytona 500 two weeks previous), driving a Buick LeSabre, dominated the crash marred, 280 lap 500 km (310 mile) race finishing first and second ahead of Dave Marcis on a day when cabin temperatures were reported to reach over 57° Celsius (135° Fahrenheit) as the race was held during Australia's notoriously hot summer.

On April 1, 1990, Bonnett suffered a life-threatening crash during the TranSouth 500 at Darlington, South Carolina, when his car slammed into Sterling Marlin's car during a 14-car crash on lap 212. He was left with amnesia and dizziness and retired from racing and turned to television, becoming a race color commentator for TNN, CBS Sports, and TBS Sports, and hosting the TV show Winners for TNN.

However, Bonnett still desired to continue racing. In 1992, he began testing cars for good friends Dale Earnhardt and car owner Richard Childress. Cleared to race again in 1993 and upon Earnhardt's suggestion, Childress gave Bonnett a ride for the 1993 DieHard 500 at Talladega Superspeedway which was numbered 31 and sponsored by GM Goodwrench. But his comeback race was marred by a crash in which his car spun, became airborne, and crashed into the spectator fence. He was uninjured and called the rest of the race from the CBS broadcast booth after being cleared at the infield care center. He would also start the final race of the 1993 season in Atlanta, but he dropped out after just three laps. The reason the team gave for removing the car from the race was a blown engine; however, he was teamed with points leader Earnhardt, and the car was retired to assist Earnhardt in winning the season's championship. Earnhardt needed to maximize his finishing position, and by Bonnett quitting the race he was assured of those three championship points. This would become Bonnett's final NASCAR Winston Cup Series start.

Death
Despite the setbacks, Bonnett was encouraged because he had secured a ride and sponsorship for at least five races in the 1994 season with car owner James Finch, including the season-opening race, the Daytona 500, for Phoenix Racing. But on February 11, 1994, during the first practice session for the 1994 Daytona 500, a shock mount broke, causing him to lose control of his Chevrolet on the track's high-banked fourth turn. The car swerved onto the track apron, and then up the steep bank, before crashing into the wall nearly head on. Bonnett did not survive the accident; he was 47 years old.

That weekend, another racing death occurred, as 1993 Goody's Dash (four-cylinder) champion Rodney Orr was also killed in a racing crash during the practices surrounding the first weekend. In the middle of the second Goodyear-Hoosier tire war, Hoosier withdrew from the race immediately.

Bonnett is buried in Pleasant Grove's cemetery, Forest Grove Memorial Gardens. A road called "Allison-Bonnett Memorial Drive" in his hometown honors him, along with fellow native Davey Allison, who died seven months earlier.

When Earnhardt, Bonnett's colleague, won the 1998 Daytona 500, he dedicated the victory to Bonnett among others.

Earnhardt himself died in a racing accident during the final lap of the 2001 Daytona 500. About three weeks after the accident, magazine photographers released photographs of Bonnett's autopsy, as well as those of another driver who died a few days later, Rodney Orr, to the public, which led to a lawsuit.

When Brad Keselowski scored Phoenix Racing's first Sprint Cup win 15 years later in the 2009 Aaron's 499 at Talladega Superspeedway, Finch dedicated the win to Bonnett. During the 2013 season, Finch designed the No. 51 car's paint scheme in the Cup and Nationwide Series like Bonnett's 1994 Country Time Chevrolet that he drove shortly before his death.

In popular culture
Bonnett was portrayed by the actor Sean Bridgers in the TV movie 3: The Dale Earnhardt Story.

Motorsports career results

NASCAR
(key) (Bold – Pole position awarded by qualifying time. Italics – Pole position earned by points standings or practice time. * – Most laps led.)

Winston Cup Series

Daytona 500

Busch Series

International Race of Champions
(key) (Bold – Pole position. * – Most laps led.)

See also
List of famous NASCAR drivers
List of NASCAR fatal accidents

References

External links

Neil Bonnett at the International Motorsports Hall of Fame

1946 births
1994 deaths
Alabama Gang
American Speed Association drivers
American television hosts
American television sports announcers
Burials in Alabama
International Motorsports Hall of Fame inductees
International Race of Champions drivers
Motorsport announcers
NASCAR drivers
NASCAR team owners
People from Hueytown, Alabama
Racing drivers from Alabama
Racing drivers who died while racing
Sports deaths in Florida
Dale Earnhardt Inc. drivers
Richard Childress Racing drivers